was a town located in Haibara District, Shizuoka Prefecture, Japan.

As of September 1, 2005, the town had an estimated population of 6,022 and a density of 49.65 persons per km². The total area was 121.37 km². The area is famous for its green tea production.

On September 20, 2005, Nakakawane, along with the town of Honkawane (also from Haibara District), was merged to create the town of Kawanehon.

Dissolved municipalities of Shizuoka Prefecture
Kawanehon, Shizuoka